Reinhard Schmitz (born 9 June 1951) is a former professional German footballer.

Schmitz made a total of 28 appearances in the Fußball-Bundesliga for 1. FC Köln and Tennis Borussia Berlin during his playing career.

References 
 

1951 births
Living people
German footballers
Association football defenders
Association football midfielders
Bundesliga players
2. Bundesliga players
1. FC Köln players
1. FC Köln II players
1. FC Union Solingen players
Tennis Borussia Berlin players
FC Viktoria Köln players